The Bay to Birdwood is a motoring event of citizen-collected vehicles that takes place annually in South Australia, formerly consisting of the Bay to Birdwood Run (for pre-1956 vehicles) and the Bay to Birdwood Classic (for 1957-1997 vehicles), which ran in even- and odd-numbered years alternately. Since 2020 it has been a large-scale run including vintage, veteran and classic cars and other road vehicles. It commences in the coastal Adelaide suburb of West Beach and concluding at the National Motor Museum in the Adelaide Hills town of Birdwood.

History 

The inaugural Bay to Birdwood took place in 1980, after the idea was raised by Bob Chantrell, of the Federation of Vintage Car Clubs (SA), inspired by the London to Brighton Veteran Car Run. The FVCC approached Donald Chisholm  , general manager of the National Motor Museum (also known as the Birdwood Mill, reflecting the building in which it was housed), who agreed to be co-organiser. He suggested and agreed to provide a perpetual trophy for the "Concours d'Elegance", with its design based on the Shearer Steam Car, which would remain on display at the Mill. S.A.S. Channel 10 would provide television advertising and a documentary after the event, and proceeds from the event would be donated to its Christmas appeal. Starting at Colley Reserve in Glenelg, its name derives from Holdfast Bay, on which Glenelg is situated.

In 2001, several changes took place. SA Water took over as sponsor, and there were several changes to the committee, which would not only organise the Run, but also the Classic event, which had previously been organised by the National Motor Museum. From 2001, both events would be organised by the same committee, and both would follow the same route, the starting point of which was changed from Glenelg to the Barratt Reserve at West Beach, owing to traffic bottlenecks around Glenelg. The cars would turn east past the airport and along Tapleys Hill Road to Anzac Highway, with computer-controlled traffic lights adding smooth passage.

As of its 30th anniversary in 2010, the Bay to Birdwood Run was being held every two years, open to vehicles manufactured before 1956, alternating each year with the Bay to Birdwood Classic for vehicles manufactured from 1956 to 1977. In 2013, the route of the Classic changed its previous routing: instead of travelling via North East Road, the cars would travel along Tapleys Hill Road, Anzac Highway and Greenhill Road and then turn into Glen Osmond Road and travel up the South Eastern Freeway. This would take the cars past Verdun, Balhannah, Oakbank, Woodside, Charleston, and Mount Torrens en route to Birdwood.

Prior to 2020, the Bay to Birdwood Classic event was held in odd-numbered years and was for vehicles manufactured from 1956 to 1986, thus focusing on vintage and veteran vehicles. Since 2020, the annual event has welcomed all historic vehicles regardless of manufacturing year.

In 2020, during the COVID-19 pandemic, the Bay to Birdwood was one of the first major large-scale public events to take place after the first national pandemic restrictions, and the 40th anniversary edition was modified to suit the changed conditions for public events. The format was popular, attracting around 90,000 spectators. However the 2021 event, due to take place on 26 September, did not go ahead, due to an increased number of cases of COVID-19 in the state.

The 2022 event, to be held in October, will include electric-modified vehicles for the first time, and some 1,500 drivers are expected to participate.

The archive of programs from all events is available on the Bay to Birdwood website.

Description 
The Bay to Birdwood is now one of the biggest historical motoring celebrations of its type globally, including cars dating back to the early 1900s. Since 2020, the annual event welcomes all historic vehicles regardless of manufacturing year.

The event organisers, the History Trust of South Australia, curates the proportion and representative numbers of different eras of motoring heritage with an emphasis on early motoring and pivotal significant periods in motoring history. Thousands of spectators line the approximately  route to view the passing parade of historic motoring from vantage points along the side of the road. The run includes antique, veteran, vintage, post-war/early-classic, classic, post-classic and modern classic cars, motorbikes, buses, military vehicles and occasionally fire engines.

The Bay to Birdwood starts on the Adelaide foreshore, leaving from Barratt Reserve in the Adelaide suburb of West Beach. Participants and spectators can view the hundreds of entrant vehicles displayed in the grounds of the museum. Many drivers dress in attire to match the period of their vehicle.

Past winners

Concours d’Elegance
Bay to Birdwood Run

The trophy for winners of the Concours d’Elegance, which is based on the design of the Shearer Steam Car, is engraved with the winners' names and held at the museum.

 2021 - No award (event not run due to COVID) 
 2020 Geoffrey Mitton – 1904 De Dion-Bouton Type V
 2018 Stan Livissiano - 1959 Chrysler Imperial Crown Convertible
 2016 Ryan, Kirsty and Flynn Turner – 1926 Pontiac
 2014 John and Robyn Whittaker – 1953 Mercedes 300s
 2012 Jason Edwards – 1955 MG TF 1500
 2010 Neil & Gaynor Francis – 1914 Napier T68 Tourer
 2008 David Lean – 1941 BMW R12 Motorcycle Outfit
 2006 John & Robyn Whittaker – 1952 Mercedes 220
 2004 Peter Whelan – 1929 Packard Limousine
 2002 Claude & Elizabeth Minge – 1924 Nash Hearse
 2000 Don & Marg Evans – 1948 Jaguar Mk V
 1998 Donald & Elsa Cuppleditch – 1913 Empire Runabout
 1996 Allan & Judy Steele – 1924 Rugby Tourer
 1994 Roly & Helen Forss – 1928 Talbot
 1992 Chris & Jenny Sorenson – 1904 Di Dion
 1990 Jim M Ellis – 1928 Packard Tourer
 1988 Mal Verco – 1912 Ford T Runabout & JM Ellis – 1928 Packard Limousine
 1986 Colin Davis – 1909 Renault
 1984 Donald & Elsa Cuppleditch – 1913 Empire Runabout
 1982 Terry Parker – 1908 Matchless Motorcycle
 1980 Stephen, Christina, Gabriella & Elizabeth Boros – 1930 Model A Ford

Bay to Birdwood Classic
 2021 No award (event not run due to COVID)
 2020 Peter Cadzow – 1968 Ford Falcon XT GT
 2019 Alvin Chua - 1957 BMW Isetta 300
 2017 Paul Mason - 1968 Holden HK Monaro
 2015 Mark & Julia, Chloe & Amber Kraulis – 1956 Chevrolet Belair
 2013 Anthony & Luisa Perre – 1967 Chevrolet Chevelle Coupe
 2011 Peter & Lynda Ninnis – 1958 Ford Skyliner Convertible
 2009 Leon Parbs – 1969 Ford Capri 1600 GT
 2007 Greg Meyers – 1971 MV Augusta 125 GTLS Motorcycle
 2005 Lyell & Julie Blackman – 1956 M.G. A Roadster
 2003 Mick Mitolo – 1955 M.G. TF Roadster
 2001 Graham Juttner – 1962 Jaguar Mk II Sedan
 1999 David Major – 1954 Aston Martin DB2/4 Coupe
 1997 Cestra Holdings L P Khabbaz – 1965 Ford XP Coupe

Preservation Class
In 2016, the Bay to Birdwood introduced a new judging category and trophy for vehicles that are substantially unaltered from original delivery and have not been restored or modified.

Bay to Birdwood Run
 2021 No award (event not run due to COVID)
 2020 Ian Oates – 1912 Ford Model T
 2018 Elizabeth Murphy - 1935 Chrysler Plymouth 
 2016 Inaugural Preservation Class winner – Natalie Halstead with her late husband's 1958 Sunbeam motorbike 

Bay to Birdwood Classic 

 2021 No award (event not run due to COVID)
 2020 Ryan Piekarski – 1969 Holden HT Monaro GTS
 2019 John McConville 1973 Mercedes Benz 280E
 2017 Paul Aikman - 1966 Pontiac Bonneville

References

External links

Bay to Birdwood Run 1980–2010 : , by William Hall Watson, past president, Federation of Historic Motoring Clubs SA Inc, former member Bay to Birdwood Run Committee Inc.

Motorsport in South Australia
Adelaide Hills